Gerritea is a genus of Bolivian plants in the family Poaceae. The only known species is Gerritea pseudopetiolata, native to La Paz Department in Bolivia.

References

Panicoideae
Endemic flora of Bolivia
Monotypic Poaceae genera